Allison Amaechina Madueke (born 1944) is a retired Nigerian naval officer. He was Chief of Naval Staff of Nigeria from 1993 to 1994, military governor of Anambra State from January 1984 to August 1985, and Imo State military governor from 1985 to 1986.

Background
Allison Madueke was born in 1944 in Agbariji-Inyi, Oji River, Enugu State, and is of Igbo origin.
He attended the Britannia Royal College, Dartmouth England and the School of Maritime Operations, Southwick. He became a Member of the Royal Institute of Navigation, London (MRIN) and Member of the Nautical Institute, London (MNI). 
He was later granted two honorary Doctorate degrees in Science from Enugu State University of Technology, and in Law from Abia State University. He was also granted an honorary Doctorate degree in Science from the University of Nigeria, Nsukka in 2010.

His second wife Diezani Alison-Madueke was the first female director of Shell Petroleum Development Company of Nigeria, later to become Nigeria's minister of transportation on July 26, 2007.

Naval career

Madueke studied at the Nigerian Defense Academy between 1964 and 1967.
He served at the Embassy of Nigeria as Naval Attache in Washington DC, USA.
After a military coup d'état overthrew civilian President Shehu Shagari on December 31, 1983, as Navy Captain he was appointed governor of Anambra State from January 1984 to August 1985, and then of Imo State until 1986 during the military regimes of Generals Muhammadu Buhari and Ibrahim Babangida.
Promoted to rear admiral, from 1993-1994 he served briefly as Chief of Naval Staff under General Sani Abacha.
He was sacked after a Supreme Military Council meeting in August 1994 where he supported the release of the elected civilian president Moshood Abiola, who had been imprisoned after the coup that brought Abacha to power.

Later career

After retiring from the navy, Madueke became Chairman of Radam Maritime Services Ltd., executive chairman of Interconnect Clearinghouse and Chairman of the Board of Trustees of the National ICT Merit Awards
He also was appointed to the boards of Regalia Nigeria Ltd, Excel E & P (Marginal Oil Fields) Ltd., Solid Rock Securities and Investments Ltd. and Image Consultants Ltd.

References

 

Living people
1944 births
Governors of Anambra State
Governors of Imo State
Nigerian Defence Academy alumni
People from Enugu State
Abia State University alumni
Igbo politicians
Chiefs of Naval Staff (Nigeria)